HOS may refer to:

Military
 Croatian Armed Forces (Independent State of Croatia), active during World War II
 Croatian Defence Forces, the military arm of the Croatian Party of Rights (1991–1993)

Sports
 Croatian Volleyball Federation
 Head of the Schuylkill Regatta, in Philadelphia, Pennsylvania, United States

Other uses
 Book of Hosea, part of the Hebrew Bible
 Head of state
 Hearts of Space, an American radio program
 Hellenic Ornithological Society
 Heroes of the Storm, a multiplayer online video game 
 Higher-order statistics
 Holt–Oram syndrome, an autosomal dominant disorder
 Home Ownership Scheme, Hong Kong
 Hornbeck Offshore Services
 Hours of service, U.S. regulations governing working hours of commercial vehicle operators
 House of Staunton, an American chess equipment manufacturer
 Humanistische Omroep, a Dutch broadcaster
 Saigon Sign Language (ISO 639-3:hos)
 Sikorsky HOS, a helicopter
 Hekscher-Ohlin-Samuelson model, an extension of the Heckscher–Ohlin mathematical model of international trade

Places
 Hostomel Airport

See also 
 Ho (disambiguation)
 Hoss (disambiguation)